Phyllodactylus thompsoni is a species of gecko, a lizard in the family Phyllodactylidae. The species is endemic to Peru.

Etymology
The  specific name, thompsoni, is in honor of American malacologist Fred Gilbert Thompson (1934–2016), who was also a herpetologist and collected the holotype of this species.

Geographic range
P. thompsoni is found in northwestern Peru, in the regions (formerly departments) of Amazonas, Cajamarca, and La Libertad.

Habitat

Description
P. thompsoni has an enlarged postanal scale, a character lacking in all other species of its genus in mainland South America. Not a large species, its maximum recorded snout-to-vent length (SVL) is only .

Reproduction
P. thompsoni is oviparous.

References

Further reading
Koch C, Venegas PJ, Santa Cruz R, Böhme W (2018). "Annotated checklist and key to the species of amphibians and reptiles inhabiting the northern Peruvian dry forest along the Andean valley of the Marañon River and its tributaries". Zootaxa 4385 (1): 001–101.
Venegas PJ, Townsend JH, Koch C, Böhme W (2008). "Two New Sympatric Species of Leaf-Toed Geckos (Gekkonidae: Phyllodactylus) from the Balsas Region of the Upper Marañon Valley, Peru". Journal of Herpetology 42 (2): 386–396. (Phyllodactylus thompsoni, new species).

Phyllodactylus
Reptiles of Peru
Reptiles described in 2008